The 1954 Little League World Series was held from August 24 to August 27 in Williamsport, Pennsylvania. The Schenectady Little League of Schenectady, New York, defeated the Colton Little League of Colton, California, in the championship game of the eighth Little League World Series.

Teams

Championship Bracket

Notable players
Jim Barbieri of Schenectady, New York, and Boog Powell of Lakeland, Florida, would become the first player to appear in both the Little League World Series and an MLB World Series. After both playing in the 1954 LLWS (Barbieri had also played in the  LLWS) they both played in the 1966 World Series; Barbieri for the Los Angeles Dodgers and Powell for the Baltimore Orioles.
 Billy Connors of Schenectady later became an MLB pitcher and pitching coach.
Ken Hubbs from Colton, California, became a second baseman for the Chicago Cubs, and won a Gold Glove and was the National League Rookie of the Year in 1962.  He died in a plane crash near Provo, Utah, before the 1964 season.
 Carl Taylor of Lakeland, stepbrother of Boog Powell, went on to be an MLB catcher and outfielder.

References

External links
1954 Tournament Bracket via Wayback Machine
1954 Line Scores via Wayback Machine

Little League World Series
Little League World Series
Little League World Series
Little League World Series
Little League World Series